Broxton Rocks is the single largest exposure of sandstone, about 4 miles in extent, found in the Altamaha Grit, a subterranean band of sandstone that lies under some  of the Atlantic Coastal Plain. The Broxton Rocks waterfall is Georgia's southernmost. The preserve lies on a direct line from Atlanta, Georgia, 185 miles by road to the north-west, to Jacksonville, Florida, 145 miles by road to the south-east. Broxton Rocks is located at 31°43'56.25"N, 82°51'11.75"W (31.7323°N, 82.8533°W). Broxton Rocks is located in north-east Coffee County, Georgia.

Geology
Part of the Atlantic coastal plain, Broxton Rocks' sandstone layers were created by the slow erosion of the Altamaha Formation, dating from the Middle Miocene era.  Fractures have opened up throughout the feature, some wide enough to allow a person to walk through, some narrow but deep. Where the waters of Rocky Creek, a first-order intermittent stream, drop to a lower level, a  waterfall has formed a pool in the sandstone before it flows out and through the lower reaches of the feature before draining into the Ocmulgee River.

Flora and fauna

Plants
Broxton Rocks is the home to about 530 plant species, several of which are threatened or endangered species.  Included among these are the green-fly orchid, grit portulaca, silky creeping morning glory, Georgia plume, filmy fern and shoestring fern. Some species found here were thought to be extinct; several found here grow almost exclusively in other climates such as the tropics or Appalachian Mountains. In spring, flower species like flame azaleas and fameflower bring a blaze of color to the ravine. The preserve lies in an area of longleaf pine ecosystem which once stretched from the Atlantic Ocean to the eastern reaches of Texas.  The Nature Conservancy seeks to restore the longleaf pine to the lands it manages in the preserve through ecological restoration.

Animals
The preserve is home to over 100 species of birds. The near-threatened* Bachman's sparrow and the pileated woodpecker, whose drum-like peck can be heard over long distances, all nest here. Other animals include the armadillo, the woodrat, the flying squirrel, the vulnerable* gopher tortoise, and the threatened* indigo snake.

 * Denotes species' conservation status

Human history
Archaeological research shows that there was a Spanish-era (1568–1684) dwelling believed to belong to aboriginal peoples.

Broxton Rocks appears to have had several name changes in its history. Three decades ago it was more commonly known locally as simply The Rocks. Ward's History of Coffee County, published in 1930, pp 271, says of Broxton Rocks, "'The Picnic Rocks' - Its ruggedness begins with the great grey boulders of the picnic rocks, known in former times as "falling waters," for there was quite a water fall at this spot which was near the home of Major McNeill, one of the pioneer naval stores operators from Robeson County, North Carolina, who gave the place its name."  He continues in the next paragraph, "From there on to the Ocmulgee River, there were two great cliffs lining each side of a wooded stretch through which this stream flowed, great grey boulders with crevasses in them, and others poised perilously on top of each other just as though there had been a great upheaval there in the days gone by."  Ward appears to indicate that the local appellation for the feature was "The Picnic Rocks", but that a past name was "falling waters". Current research doesn't indicate if that was or was not a translation from an indigenous tongue, e.g. Creek or Seminole.

References

Further reading
 Off The Beaten Path Georgia: A Guide To Unique Places, 9th edition; Schemmel, William; The Globe Pequot Press, 2009. 
 Wildflowers of Georgia; Nourse, Hugh and Nourse, Carol; University of Georgia Press, 2000. 
 Footprints Across the South: Bartram's Trail Revisited; Kautz, James; Kennesaw State University Press, 2006.

External links
 Green-fly orchid image, Summit To The Sea. Retrieved 2010-7-12.
 flickr photo set for the Broxton Rocks Preserve, The Nature Conservancy. Cressler, Alan. Retrieved 2010-7-12.
 Broxton Rocks images, Dr Ready's home page, Middle Georgia College website. Retrieved 2010-7-12.
 Broxton Rocks Preserve by Sherri Smith Brown, Brown's Guides. Retrieved 2010-7-12.
 Longleaf Pine Ecosystem, The New Georgia Encyclopedia. Retrieved 2010-7-12.
 Broxton Rocks, The New Georgia Encyclopedia. Retrieved 2010-7-13.
 Broxton Rocks wetlands mitigation tract testing report, Society for Georgia Archaeology. Retrieved 2010-07-12.

Landforms of Coffee County, Georgia
Protected areas of Coffee County, Georgia
Nature reserves in Georgia (U.S. state)
Nature Conservancy preserves
Landforms of Georgia (U.S. state)
Rock formations of the United States